Phialopsis is a genus of hydrozoans in the family Eirenidae.

Species
The genus contains the following species:

Phialopsis averruciformis Huang, Xu & Lin, 2013
Phialopsis diegensis Torrey, 1909

References

Eirenidae
Hydrozoan genera